The El Salvador national football team 2009 season was the 88th season of the El Salvador national football team, their 71st season in FIFA and 47th season in CONCACAF.

The following are fixtures and results in 2009.

Record

Match results

2009 UNCAF Nations Cup

Friendly matches

2010 FIFA World Cup qualifiers

2009 Gold Cup

References

External links
 El Salvador: Fixtures and Results

2009
El
2009–10 in Salvadoran football 
2008–09 in Salvadoran football